The Ucayali Peneplain is a large near-flat erosion surface, a peneplain, located in the Amazon basin. The Ucayali Peneplain is largely buried by sediments forming an unconformity. Its origin has been dated to the Miocene epoch. The Peneplain was first described in 1948 in the Contamana region of Peru.

References

Amazon basin
Amazon River
Erosion landforms
Landforms of Bolivia 
Plains of Brazil
Landforms of Colombia 
Landforms of Peru
Miocene South America
Stratigraphy of Colombia
Stratigraphy of Bolivia
Stratigraphy of Brazil
Stratigraphy of Peru
Unconformities
Planation surfaces